The 2012 Brentwood Borough Council election to the Brentwood Borough Council in Essex took place on Thursday 3 May 2012.

Election result

Ward Results

References

2012
2012 English local elections
2010s in Essex